The women's singles of the 2017 Advantage Cars Prague Open tournament was played on clay in Prague, Czech Republic.

Antonia Lottner was the defending champion, but chose not to participate.

Markéta Vondroušová won the title, defeating Karolína Muchová in the final, 7–5, 6–1.

Seeds

Draw

Finals

Top half

Bottom half

References

External Links
Main Draw

Advantage Cars Prague Open - Singles
Advantage Cars Prague Open